The 44th Rifle Corps was a corps of the Red Army of the Soviet Union. It took part in the Great Patriotic War in 1941 and 1943-45.

On 22 June 1941, the corps consisted of the 64th Rifle Division and the 108th Rifle Division (General Major Alexander Mavrichev on 22 June 1941). Sources are unclear whether the corps was assigned to the 13th Army that day or directly responsible to the Western Special Military District. Two days later the WSMD became the Western Front.

Commanders 
 Major General Vasily Yushkevich (04.03.1941 - 11.09.1941),
 Major General Michail Kleshnin (26.05.1943 - 11.05.1945)

References 

 

Rifle corps of the Soviet Union
Military units and formations established in 1941